The Committee on Petitions (PETI) is a permanent committee of the European Parliament to offer a petition process including a web portal to create and admit petitions. Its current chair, elected on 10 July 2019, is Dolors Montserrat, member of the EPP Group.

The right to petition is one of the fundamental rights of the European citizen and residents. Any of these can bring forward a petition on a matter within the EU's sphere of activities. The Committee hears cases, some 1500 each year, sometimes presented in Parliament by the citizen themselves. While the Parliament attempts to resolve the issue as a mediator, it can resort to legal proceedings if necessary to resolve the citizen's dispute.

See also
European Citizens' Initiative

References

External links
 Official Webpage
 Petitions Web Portal with petitions database and search

Petitions